Biston panterinaria is a moth of the family Geometridae. It is found in China (Liaoning, Beijing, Hebei, Shanxi, Shandong, Henan, Shaanxi, Ningxia, Gansu, Anhui, Zhejiang, Hubei, Jiangxi, Hunan, Fujian, Guangdong, Hainan, Guangxi, Sichuan, Guizhou, Yunnan, Tibet), India, Nepal, Sikkim, Vietnam and Thailand.

Adults mimick the pattern of distasteful or poisonous species of the genus Abraxas. The wings are white and scattered with pale grey markings, which are rarely present basally of the hindwing postmedial line. The base of the forewing is grey and has a large brown patch, accompanied by a yellowish brown antemedial line.

Subspecies
Biston panterinaria panterinaria (northern China)
Biston panterinaria sychnospilas (Prout, 1930) (Japan)
Biston panterinaria exanthemata (Moore, 1888) (India, Nepal, Vietnam, Thailand, Yunnan and Tibet)

Biston panterinaria lienpingensis (Guangdong, China), Biston panterinaria szechuanensis (Sichuan, China) and Biston panterinaria abraxata (Jiangxi, China) are now considered synonyms of Biston panterinaria panterinaria.

References

Moths described in 1853
Bistonini
Moths of Japan